Philip Yancey (born November 4, 1949) is an American author who writes primarily about spiritual issues. His books have sold more than 15 million copies in English and have been translated into 40 languages, making him one of the best-selling contemporary Christian authors. Two of his books have won the ECPA's Christian Book of the Year Award: The Jesus I Never Knew in 1996, and What's So Amazing About Grace? in 1998. He is published by Hachette, HarperCollins Christian Publishing, InterVarsity Press, and Penguin Random House.

Life and career 

Yancey was born in Atlanta and grew up in nearby suburbs. When he was one year old, his father, stricken with polio, died after church members suggested he go off life support in faith that God would heal him. This and other negative experiences with a rigid, conservative, fundamentalist church background contributed to Yancey's losing his faith at one point and deeply questioning the established church at other times. After high school he attended Columbia Bible College in South Carolina, where he met his wife, Janet. He went on to earn graduate degrees in communications and English from Wheaton College Graduate School and the University of Chicago.

While living in the Chicago, Illinois suburbs, in 1971 Yancey joined the staff of Campus Life magazine—a publication directed towards high school and college students—where he served as editor for eight years. For three decades Yancey contributed as an editor-at-large, for Christianity Today, and also wrote articles for publications including Reader's Digest, The Saturday Evening Post, Publishers Weekly,The Atlantic, Chicago Magazine, Christian Century, and National Wildlife.

As a journalist, he has interviewed two U. S. presidents and other notable people such as Bono, Billy Graham, and the authors Annie Dillard, John Updike, and Henri Nouwen. Former president Jimmy Carter has called Yancey "my favorite modern author".

Yancey lives in Colorado, working as a freelance writer. Traveling widely for speaking engagements, he has visited over 85 countries.

Yancey suffered a broken neck in a motor vehicle accident in February 2007 but recovered. In August that year he completed his goal of climbing all 54 of Colorado's -plus peaks, the final three after his accident.

Bibliography 

After the Wedding (1976)
Where Is God When It Hurts? (1977) Gold Medallion Book Award (updated edition published in 1990, special edition in 2001), 
Secrets of the Christian Life (1979) (co-authored with Tim Stafford and first published as 'Unhappy Secrets of the Christian Life'), 
Fearfully and Wonderfully Made (1980) – co-authored with physician Paul W. Brand; Gold Medallion Book Award; 
Open Windows (1982), 
Insight (1982)
In His Image (1984) – co-authored with physician Paul W. Brand; Gold Medallion Book Award; 
NIV Student Bible (1986) – co-edited with Tim Stafford; Gold Medallion Book Award; 
Disappointment with God (1988); Gold Medallion Book Award;  Christianity Todays Book of the Year; 
I Was Just Wondering (1989) – excerpts from previous books and article 
A Guided Tour of the Bible: 6 Months of Daily Readings (1989), 
Praying with the KGB: A Startling Report from a Shattered Empire (1992) –  
Discovering God: A Devotional Journey Through the Bible (1993)
Pain: The Gift Nobody Wants (1993) – co-authored with physician Paul W. Brand; reissued in 1997 as The Gift of Pain; Gold Medallion Book Award; 
The Jesus I Never Knew (1995) –  Gold Medallion Book Award and ECPA Christian Book of the Year; 
Finding God in Unexpected Places (1995) (updated 2nd edition published in 2005) – 
What's So Amazing About Grace? (1997) Gold Medallion Book Award and ECPA Christian Book of the Year; 
The Bible Jesus Read (1999) –  Gold Medallion Book Award; 
Reaching for the Invisible God (2000) – 
Meet the Bible: A Panorama of God's Word in 366 Daily Readings and Reflections (2000) – co-authored with Brenda Quinn
Soul Survivor: How My Faith Survived the Church (2001) – 
Church: Why Bother?: My Personal Pilgrimage (2001) – Gold Medallion Book Award; 
Rumors of Another World (2003) – renamed as A Skeptic's Guide to Faith (2009), 
In the Likeness of God (2004) – The Dr. Paul Brand tribute edition of Fearfully and Wonderfully Made and In His Image, 
Designer Sex (2005) – 32-page booklet
Finding God in Unexpected Places: Revised Edition –  Doubleday, 2005
When We Hurt : Prayer, Preparation & Hope for Life's Pain (2006)
Prayer: Does It Make Any Difference? (2006) – 
What Good Is God? (2010) – 
The Question That Never Goes Away (2014) – 
Vanishing Grace: Bringing Good News to a Deeply Divided World (2014) – 
Fearfully and Wonderfully: The Marvel of Bearing God’s Image (2019) – 
A Companion in Crisis: A Modern Paraphrase of John Donne’s Devotions (2021) – 
Where the Light Fell: A Memoir (2021) –

References

External links 
 
 Official biography by Zondervan Publishing
 Yancey in Christianity Today

1949 births
American Christian writers
American columnists
American magazine editors
Writers from Colorado
Writers from Atlanta
Living people
Wheaton College (Illinois) alumni
Writers from Chicago
Columbia International University alumni
University of Chicago alumni